Jews in Macedonia may refer to:

 Jews in Greece, including Greek Macedonia and Thessaloniki
 Jews in North Macedonia